Johan Albert Ravila (28 December 1897 – 28 June 1980) was a Finnish sports shooter and a military officer. He finished in seventh place in the 50 m rifle event at the 1948 Summer Olympics.

References

1897 births
1980 deaths
Finnish male sport shooters
Olympic shooters of Finland
Shooters at the 1948 Summer Olympics
Sportspeople from Helsinki